TTNET A.Ş., operating under the Türk Telekom brand, is the largest Internet service provider in Turkey and has around 7 million subscribers.  TTNET is a subsidiary of Türk Telekom Group. 

Currently, Mohammad Hariri is Chairman of the Board of Directors and Abdullah Orkun KAYA is the CEO of the TTNET.

In February 2010, TTNET launched a new service called Tivibu, which combines television and cinema.  This service allows users to access both television and a library of movies via both mobile phones and computers.

On 26 January 2016, Türk Telekom decided to use single brand "Türk Telekom", for its mobile networking, landlines and internet service provider.

Brands
Tivibu is  an Internet television service that is provided by TTNET. This service offers television and cinema experiences to the users in Turkey through its high-speed broadband service. WebTV does not require the user to have a fixed location or a set-top-box. The software and the middleware for Tivibu, have been developed by Argela.

TTNET Wifi is a wireless internet connection service of TTNET. It is available on 7500 service points. TTNET Wifi service also offers abroad access service through TTNET and iPass Inc. collaboration.

TTNET Müzik is a service enabling 6M+ ADSL subscribers of TTNET to download and stream music freely on the Internet. The project includes all Turkish and foreign music libraries as long as the user uses TTNET ADSL as a service provider.

TTNET 3G is a service that offers mobile internet with 3G technology in several places in addition to coverage area of TTNET WiFi service points.

TTNET Güvenlik is a service of TTNET to protect computers from viruses and malware with TTNET GÜVENLİK McAfee Internet Security.

NETDİSK is a service of TTNET for cloud storage, giving 20GB free to all TTNET subscribers.

References

External links 
 TTNET official website (Turkish)
 TTNET official website (English)

Telecommunications companies established in 2006
Telecommunications companies of Turkey
Turkish companies established in 2006